

General managers

Statistics current through 2009 season

Owners
''Statistics updated March 3, 2019

References

 
 
Miami
Owners and executives